The Penn Center, formerly the Penn School, is an African-American cultural and educational center in the Corners Community, on Saint Helena Island.  Founded in 1862 by Quaker and Unitarian missionaries from Pennsylvania, it was the first school founded in the Southern United States specifically for the education of African-Americans.  It provided critical educational facilities to Gullah slaves freed after plantation owners fled the island, and continues to fulfill an educational mission. Leigh Richmond Miner photographed students and activities at the school.

The campus was designated a National Historic Landmark District in 1974. Darrah Hall and Brick Baptist Church on the campus were declared part of Reconstruction Era National Monument in January 2017.  In spring of 2019, it became the Reconstruction Era National Historic Park, along with Fort Sumter.

Description and history
The Penn Center is located about one mile south of Frogmore on Dr. Martin Luther King Jr. Boulevard. The  campus is divided by the road, and includes a number of historic buildings related to the original function as a school, including classrooms, living spaces for students, teachers, and administrators. The dates of construction of many of the buildings is not known, and they are not considered architecturally significant. The oldest building on the campus is the 1855 Brick Church, built by the plantation owners of the island.

At the outbreak of the American Civil War in 1861, Union Army forces quickly captured Saint Helena Island, prompting the local plantation owners to flee. The military administration of the island partitioned the old plantations, giving the land to the former slaves who lived there. The Penn School was established in 1862 by Laura Matilda Towne, an abolitionist missionary from Pittsburgh, Pennsylvania as a school for the freed slaves, which was named for William Penn, Quaker champion for human liberty and founder of Pennsylvania. For many years the work was financed by Philadelphia Quaker abolitionists. Ellen Murray, a Quaker teacher, joined her in the work. Charlotte Forten, born into a wealthy free black family in Philadelphia, joined them as the school's first black teacher. The Brick Church was used as an early meeting, educational, and administrative space, and the school's first dedicated educational building was constructed in 1864, from prefabricated parts shipped from Pennsylvania. The school remained an active educational institution for the island's population until 1948, when the state took over public education on the island. The institution then became the Penn Center, and as continued an educational mission for the island's preschoolers and adults, as well as maintaining a museum, cultural center, and conference meeting space. With the creation of the Reconstruction Era National Monument (which in spring 2019 was elevated to National Park status), Brick Baptist Church is protected by a Park Service building easement and Darrah Hall, on the campus of the Penn Center, has been deeded over to the Park Service, as well as the adjacent parking area.

Gallery

See also
Reconstruction Era National Monument
Gullah/Geechee Cultural Heritage Corridor
List of National Historic Landmarks in South Carolina
National Register of Historic Places listings in Beaufort County, South Carolina

References

Further reading

External links

Penn Center - History and Photos SCIway.net, South Carolina Information Highway
Penn Center Historic District, Beaufort County (St. Helena Island), at South Carolina Department of Archives and History
 Official website of the Penn Center, St. Helena Island, South Carolina
 Brick Baptist Chuch web site

Gullah history
Gullah culture
National Historic Landmarks in South Carolina
Buildings and structures in Berkeley County, South Carolina
Museums in Beaufort County, South Carolina
African-American museums in South Carolina
Education museums in the United States
National Register of Historic Places in Beaufort County, South Carolina
Historic districts on the National Register of Historic Places in South Carolina
1862 establishments in South Carolina
Saint Helena Island (South Carolina)
School buildings on the National Register of Historic Places in South Carolina